The Bikers is the first of 5 novels about a notorious biker gang written in the early 1970s by Richard Gordon under the pen name Alex R. Stuart. 

The plot of the series was a group of motorcycle gangs that were terrorizing contemporary Britain.

Series
The Bikers. (1971)
The Outlaws. (1972)
The Last Trip. (1972)
The Bike from Hell. (1973)
The Devil's Rider. (1973)

Book series introduced in 1971
Science fiction novel series
1970s science fiction novels
Works about outlaw motorcycle clubs
Novels set in the United Kingdom